João Francisco Fonseca dos Santos (born 19 February 1948), known as Fonseca, is a retired Portuguese footballer who played as a goalkeeper.

Honours
Benfica
Primeira Divisão: 1970–71, 1971–72
Taça de Portugal: 1969–70, 1971–72

Varzim
Segunda Divisão: 1975–76

Porto
Primeira Divisão: 1977–78, 1978–79
Supertaça Cândido de Oliveira: 1981

External links

1948 births
Living people
Sportspeople from Matosinhos
Portuguese footballers
Association football goalkeepers
Primeira Liga players
Liga Portugal 2 players
Leixões S.C. players
S.L. Benfica footballers
Varzim S.C. players
FC Porto players
F.C. Famalicão players
G.D. Chaves players
Segunda División players
CD Ourense footballers
Portugal under-21 international footballers
Portugal international footballers
Portuguese expatriate footballers
Expatriate footballers in Spain
Portuguese expatriate sportspeople in Spain
Portuguese football managers
G.D. Chaves managers
Varzim S.C. managers
A.D. Lousada managers